"Foot of the Mountain" is a song by Norwegian band A-ha, released as the lead single from their ninth studio album of the same name (2009). It was used as the official anthem of the 2009 World Championships in Athletics held in Berlin. The single reached number three in Germany, the band's highest-charting single in that country since "Take On Me" in 1985.

"Foot of the Mountain" was the most played song on Norwegian radio in 2009, with 122 hours, 32 minutes and 39 seconds of playing time, marking the first time a Norwegian artist has topped the list.

Release
"Foot of the Mountain", was released exclusively as a download single in select territories of Mainland Europe. In Germany, a physical two-track CD single was released. In the United Kingdom, a digital bundle was released.

Promotion
In May 2009, the band performed the song on the show Germany's Next Top Model hosted by Heidi Klum and on The Dome alongside fellow Norwegian Alexander Rybak. On 11 June 2009 at 8:13 CEST the music video premiered simultaneously on four major German networks, namely ProSieben, Sat.1, kabel eins and N24. It was also made available for streaming on the major German website Myvideo.de.

Music video
The music video for the track, co-directed by Olaf Heine and Mik Rahner, was shot in Berlin, Hamburg and along the Baltic coast of Pomerania. The video centers on singer Morten Harket, with brief cameo appearances by Paul Waaktaar-Savoy and Magne Furuholmen. In the documentary A-ha: The Success Story, songwriter Waaktaar-Savoy stated that although he loved living in New York, he "often wondered whether I would be happier out in the open, by the foot of the mountain", when asked about the song's chorus. In the same interview, co-writer Furuholmen said his contribution to the song, the verses, were about "urban clutter". In the video, these angles are made a point of as Harket moves from a claustrophobic Berlin to the open landscapes of Pomerania. The video was made commercially available in Germany on a special edition of the Foot of the Mountain album.

Track listings
German 2-track CD single
"Foot of the Mountain" (Radio Edit) – 3:44
"Foot of the Mountain" (Album Version) – 3:57

UK digital bundle
"Foot of the Mountain" (Radio Edit)
"Foot of the Mountain" (Album Edit)
"Foot of the Mountain" (Bohème7 Remix)
"Foot of the Mountain" (Erik Ljunggren Remix)
"Foot of the Mountain" (Video)

Charts

Weekly charts

Year-end charts

MTV Unplugged appearance 
In 2017, A-ha appeared on the television series MTV Unplugged and played and recorded acoustic versions of many of their popular songs for the album MTV Unplugged – Summer Solstice in Giske, Norway, including "Foot of the Mountain".

References

2009 singles
2009 songs
A-ha songs
Songs written by Magne Furuholmen
Songs written by Martin Terefe
Songs written by Paul Waaktaar-Savoy
Universal Music Group singles